Monochamus leuconotus (white stem borer of coffee) is a species of beetle in the family Cerambycidae. It was described by Francis Polkinghorne Pascoe in 1869, originally under the genus Anthores. It is known from Tanzania, Cameroon, Malawi, Kenya, Mozambique, Namibia, South Africa, Uganda, the Democratic Republic of the Congo, Zambia, Angola, and Zimbabwe. It feeds on Coffea arabica.

References

leuconotus
Beetles described in 1869